Bannu Biradari or All India Bannu Biradari  is the community organisation of Hindus who migrated from Bannu district of Northwest Frontier Province to India after partition of India in 1947. It consists of 11 trusts.

Bannu Biradari Bhawan Trust
Faridabad Bannu Biradari
Bannu Biradari Bhawan Kanpur
Dehradun
Lucknow
Bareily
Rampur
Bannu Biradari Kotdwara
Vrindavan Bannu Biradari Trust
Haridwar Bannu Biradari Bhawan Trust

References

People from Bannu District